Daviesia eurylobos is a species of flowering plant in the family Fabaceae and is endemic to the south-west of Western Australia. It is a spreading shrub with somewhat crowded, egg-shaped to elliptic phyllodes, and yellow and red flowers.

Description

Taxonomy and naming
The specific epithet (eurylobos) means "wide pod".

Distribution and habitat
This daviesia grows in heathland and mallee and is found between Ravensthorpe, Lake King, Peak Charles National Park and Jerdacuttup in the Esperance plains and Mallee biogeographic regions of south-western Western Australia.

Conservation status
Daviesia eurylobos is listed as "not threatened" by the Department of Biodiversity, Conservation and Attractions

References

eurylobos
Eudicots of Western Australia
Plants described in 1997
Taxa named by Michael Crisp